The 12th Pan American Games were held in Mar del Plata, Argentina from March 11 to March 26, 1995.

Medals

Gold

Silver

Men's Flyweight (– 54 kg): Juan Fernández
Men's Lightweight (– 70 kg): Eine Acevedo
Men's Middleweight (– 76 kg): Álvaro Velasco

Bronze

Men's 400 m Hurdles: Llimy Rivas
Men's High Jump: Gilmar Mayo
Women's 4x100 metres: Felipa Palacios, Mirtha Brock, Carmen Rodríguez, and Elia Mera
Women's 4x400 metres: Carmen Rodríguez, Elia Mera, Mirtha Brock, and Felipa Palacios

Men's Lightweight (– 60 kg): Francisco Osorio
Men's Middleweight (– 75 kg): Jhon Arroyo

Men's Bantamweight (– 59 kg): Roger Berrio
Men's Light-Heavyweight (– 83 kg): Erlyn Mena

See also
Colombia at the 1996 Summer Olympics

Nations at the 1995 Pan American Games
P
Colombia at the Pan American Games